Here's to You was a Canadian radio program, which aired on CBC Radio 2 (now known as CBC Music) from 9 a.m. to noon. The program, hosted by Catherine Belyea, combined the network's focus on classical music with audience interaction through stories and music requests in a format similar to CBC Radio One's The Roundup. Here's to You was previously hosted by Shelley Solmes, who retired in 2007. Here's to You was discontinued in September 2008 after a major overhaul of Radio Two, making way for new programming.

Take Five, based on a similar theme, was the predecessor of Here's to You on Radio 2 and aired in the time slot 10:00 a.m. until 3:00 p.m.

CBC Music programs
Canadian classical music radio programs